Erni Hiir (real name Ernst Hiir; 29 March 1900, in Karjatnurme, Viljandi County – 27 October 1989) was an Estonian poet and translator.

From 1921 to 1922 he studied at the University of Tartu.

From 1927, he was a member of Estonian Writers' Union. When Estonia was occupied in 1940, he was loyal to the Soviet authorities. From 1945 to 1960, he was the executive secretary of the Tartu branch of the Writers' Union. In 1962, he moved to Tallinn.

He is buried in Metsakalmistu Cemetery.

Works
 1924: poetry collection "Arlekinaad" ('Harlequinade')
 1924: poetry collection "Huhu. Merituulen" ('Huhu. In the Sea Wind')
 1926: poetry collection "Meeri-Maria-Mari"

References

1900 births
1989 deaths
Estonian male poets
20th-century Estonian writers
Estonian translators
University of Tartu alumni
Estonian military personnel of the Estonian War of Independence
People from Tõrva Parish